Khuygan-e Olya (also Romanized as Khūygān-e ‘Olyā; also known as Khāygaz, Khāygon, Khūgān, Khūīgān, Khuijān, Khūygān, Khūygān-e Arāmeneh, and Khūygān-e Arāmeneh) is a village in Barf Anbar Rural District, in the Central District of Fereydunshahr County, Isfahan Province, Iran. At the 2006 census, its population was 1,391, in 330 families.

References 

Populated places in Fereydunshahr County